Yousef Al-Jarrah  (Born June 28, 1965 in Medina) is a Saudi Arabian television actor, who started his acting career in 1985, known for his role in the Saudi comedy, Jari Ya Hammouda and Tash ma Tash, He is presented the programme called Adam on MBC channel Middle East Broadcasting Center.

Acting Works

Series
Tash ma Tash
Jari Ya Hammouda
Abu Arroyhd
Shaaban in Ramadan
 Waswash

Radio MBC FM 
Diary Abbas

Programs
Adam

References 
http://mbc.net/jaryyahamooda
Saudi Hero Abdulrahman and actor Youssef Al Jarrah in World Disability Day 2009

1965 births
Living people
Saudi Arabian male radio actors
Saudi Arabian male television actors
People from Medina